Djalmar Sistermans (born 24 December 1976) is a Dutch former professional tennis player.

Sistermans reached a career high ranking of 140 in doubles and won two ATP Challenger doubles titles.

At Wimbledon in 2002 he and Ignacio Hirigoyen came close to qualifying for the main draw when they played a marathon final round qualifier against Amir Hadad and Aisam Qureshi, which they lost 13–15 in the fifth set.

Challenger titles

Doubles: (2)

References

External links
 
 

1976 births
Living people
Dutch male tennis players
21st-century Dutch people